Shukurali Egamberdi oʻgʻli Pulatov (born 23 February 1990), simply known as Shukurali Pulatov, is an Uzbekistani footballer who plays as a defender for and captains Bangladesh Premier League club Chittagong Abahani. 

He has played in Uzbekistan Super League for more than 8 years. He captained Neftchi in 2017–18 season. He also played in Maldives, Bangladesh, Indonesia.

References 

1990 births
Living people
Uzbekistani footballers
Association football defenders
Semen Padang F.C. players
FK Neftchi Farg'ona players
FC Qizilqum Zarafshon players
FC Bunyodkor players
Abahani Limited (Chittagong) players